Abelardo Ávila Villareal (1907-1967) was a Mexican engraver noted for his Costumbrista work, mostly with the Sociedad Mexicana de Grabadores; however, he did paint one mural along with Pedro Rendón at the Abelardo L. Rodríguez market in Mexico City.

Ávila was born in 1907 in Jalpan de Serra, Querétaro. From 1921 to 1926 he studied painting at the Academia de Bellas Artes in the city of Querétaro. After receiving a scholarship, he continued studying at the Academia Nacional de Artes Plásticas in Mexico City. In 1929, with an interest in woodcut, he entered a third school called the Taller de Grabado, de Madera y Metal.

In 1934, he joined the fine arts workshop of the Liga de Escritores y Artistas Revolucionarios. That same year, he painted his only mural, in collaboration with painter Pedro Rendón, at the Abelardo L. Rodríguez market in Mexico City.

In 1947 he was one of the founding members of the Sociedad Mexicana de Grabadores, with which he did most of his artistic work. He also gave classes at the Escuela Nacional de Pintura, Escultura y Grabado "La Esmeralda" from this time until his death. He was also a founding member of the Salón de la Plástica Mexicana. The themes of his work were mostly Costumbrista which gave him a reputation as a historian.

He died at age fifty nine of a heart attack on July 24, 1967, in Mexico City, leaving behind his wife, artist Cecilia Bustamante.

References

1907 births
1967 deaths
Mexican engravers
Academic staff of Escuela Nacional de Pintura, Escultura y Grabado "La Esmeralda"
20th-century engravers